Ejido (Venezuelan ) is a town in the state of Mérida, Venezuela. It is the shire town of the Campo Elías Municipality. It was founded in 1650 in an area with indigenous Guayabas, and became a center for cane sugar cultivation. It is close to the state capital, Mérida, Mérida, and forms part of its metropolitan area, with a total population of around 350,000. It is connected to Mérida by public transport, including the Mérida trolleybus system.

External links

Cities in Mérida (state)
Populated places established in 1650
1650 establishments in the Spanish Empire